Kirill Shokurov (born 7 April 1994) is a Belarusian professional footballer who is currently playing for Veles-2020 Vitebsk.

References

External links
 
 
 Profile at Belshina website

1994 births
Living people
People from Babruysk
Sportspeople from Mogilev Region
Belarusian footballers
Association football forwards
FC Belshina Bobruisk players
FC Volna Pinsk players
FC Khimik Svetlogorsk players
FC Orsha players
FC Lida players